The Odisha Women's League (OWL), previously known as FAO Women's League, is the women's top division football league of Odisha. The league is the among the existing top tier women's football leagues in India. The league is organised every year by the apex football governing body of Odisha, the Football Association of Odisha (FAO), in association with the Department of Sports and Youth Services (DSYS) of the Government of Odisha. It is currently contested by 6 clubs across the state.

Since the inception of the Odisha Women's League, a total of four clubs have been crowned champions. East Coast Railway and Rising Students Club have won the most titles in league history, being crowned champions thrice. Chand Club, Odisha Police, and SAI-STC have won it once.

History
Odisha Women's League was brought up as AT Group Women's Football League in the year 2011 as Odisha's premier level women's football league. The Football Association of Odisha (FAO) introduced the league system to provide a platform for women to showcase their footballing abilities. The league system eventually continued to be a hit among the footballing enthusiasts of Odisha. Footballing talents from the FAO Women's League are recruited in the Odisha women's football team, and eventually in India women's national football team.

On 27 February 2021, during the press meet and jersey launch ceremony for the 2020-21 season, the league was rechristened as Odisha Women's League. The ceremony took place in the presence of Principal Secretary of Department of Sports and Youth Services, Vishal Kumar Dev, and Honorary Secretary of Football Association of Odisha (FAO) at the Kalinga Stadium.

Venues

Bhubaneswar
 Kalinga Stadium
 Capital Football Arena
 OSAP 7th Battalion Ground

Cuttack
 Barabati Stadium
 Odisha Police Ground
 Ravenshaw University Ground
 Sports Hostel Ground

Clubs

Championships

Championships by team

See also
Odisha women's football team

References

Women's football leagues in India
Football in Odisha
Sports competitions in Odisha
Sports leagues established in 2011
2011 establishments in Odisha